Umar Khalid (born Syed Umar Khalid) is an Indian student activist, former research scholar at Jawaharlal Nehru University, former leader of Democratic Students' Union (DSU) in JNU. He was allegedly involved in the Jawaharlal Nehru University sedition row and is an accused under the UAPA law. Khalid is also associated with United Against Hate (UAH), a campaign founded along with Nadeem Khan (social activist) in July 2017 in response to the series of lynchings.

Early life and education
Umar Khalid was born in Jamia Nagar, New Delhi, and has lived there for the last 30 years. His father, Syed Qasim Rasool Ilyas, is from Maharashtra, while his mother is from Western Uttar Pradesh. S.Q.R. Ilyas is the National President of the Welfare Party of India and a former member of Students Islamic Movement of India, a banned Islamist Terrorist organisation, which he left in 1985.

Khalid studied history at the Kirori Mal College of the Delhi University. He later did his master's and MPhil in history at Jawarhlal Nehru University (JNU). His MPhil dissertation was on 'Hos of Singhbhum'.
 Khalid describes himself as a hardcore communist who is not a practising Muslim.

Khalid's PhD thesis was titled “Contesting claims and contingencies of the rule on Adivasis of Jharkhand” and was submitted to the JNU in 2018. Following his PhD, he published a research article titled "Changing Village Authority in an Adivasi Hinterland: State, Community and Contingencies of Rule in Singhbhum, 1830–1897" in the journal Social Scientist in 2018.

Activism and controversies

JNU Sedition Row 

On 9 February 2016, students of Jawaharlal Nehru University (JNU) held a protest on their campus against the capital punishment meted out to the 2001 Indian Parliament attack convict Afzal Guru, and Kashmiri separatist Maqbool Bhat.

Four days after the event, the Delhi Police arrested JNU Student Union president Kanhaiya Kumar on charges of sedition and criminal conspiracy. Five other students including Umar Khalid went into hiding. After their return 10 days later, Umar Khaled and Anirban Bhattacharya was also taken into custody.

The arrest and the use of sedition charges were widely criticized as suppression of political dissent. An inquiry committee appointed by the administration of JNU meted out varying punishments to a number of students. Kanhaiya Kumar was fined 10,000 rupees, Umar Khalid and Anirban Bhattacharya were rusticated for one semester. JNU refused to allow Umar Khalid to submit his PhD thesis in July 2018. Khalid went to the Delhi High Court, and obtained an order allowing him to submit his thesis. On 2 August 2018, JNU accepted the PhD thesis submission.

On 28 February 2020, the Delhi government gave its approval for a trial in the sedition case.

Bhima Koregaon incident 

Along with Jignesh Mevani, Umar Khalid was booked under a first-information report for giving 'provocative' speeches in Pune. The criminal charges against Mevani and Khalid was for promoting enmity between different groups through their speeches. The Elgaar Parishad rally, where this reportedly happened, was held in Pune to mark the 200th year of the Battle of Koregaon, a place in present-day Pune district, which was fought between the then British Indian Army and the Peshwas.

Assassination attempt 
On 13 August 2018, Khalid narrowly escaped an assassination attempt. The two accused were arrested on 20 August 2018 by police from Fatehabad, Haryana. Before the arrest, the accused had uploaded a video on Facebook on 15 August, saying the attack was an Independence Day gift for India, and they also wanted to highlight the issue of cow protection.

Arrest in 2020 

Umar Khalid was booked under UAPA by Delhi Police for his alleged "provocative speeches" during the visit of American President Donald Trump to India. Delhi police considered his speeches as instigating and facilitating the 2020 Delhi riots. On 14 September 2020, Khalid was arrested by the Delhi Police Special Cell as an alleged conspirator in the Delhi Riots case.

In charge sheets related to the riots, the police have said Khalid met suspended and jailed Aam Aadmi Party's councillor Tahir Hussain and activist Khalid Saifi on 8 January at the Shaheen Bagh sit-in protest site against the Citizenship (Amendment) Act (CAA)-National Register of Citizens (NRC) to allegedly plan the riots. He was interrogated twice for his alleged role. The police also linked Khalid's speeches to the riots. The Delhi Police's special cell is looking into a larger conspiracy case in addition to multiple cases filed in connection with the riots.

Delhi Police has filed supplementary charge sheet against Umar Khalid in connection with the Delhi riots. The police said this case is a multi-layered conspiracy and a pre-planned riot and there is sufficient evidence available to proceed against Khalid. In early January 2021, a Delhi court agreed with the chargesheet. Khalid filed a bail plea in July 2021, after eight month long hearing his bail application was dismissed. In the bail order the court said that the allegations against Khalid are prima facie true and his role in the "context of conspiracy" related to Delhi riots was apparent. In March 2022, the court denied bail to Khalid. An Additional Sessions Judge Amitabh Rawat stated that Khalid's plea had "no merit and substance" for the bail to be granted.

On 13 September 2022, as he completes two years in Tihar Jail under the Unlawful Activities (Prevention) Act or UAPA, accused by the Delhi Police of involvement in 2020 Delhi riots, The Wire published Khalid's response to an open letter. By employing UAPA, he says, we can be kept in jail for years, without those framing us needing to prove anything.

On 18 October 2022, the Delhi High Court dismissed the bail plea of Khalid, as Delhi Police opposed it.

On December 3, 2022, a Delhi court acquitted him in stone pelting case during Delhi riots.

References

External links
 
 
 

Living people
Indian activists
Kirori Mal College alumni
Jawaharlal Nehru University alumni
1987 births
Centre for Political Studies (CPS), Jawaharlal Nehru University
People involved in the Citizenship Amendment Act protests
Delhi University alumni
Indian communists